Bahar-e Olya (also Romanized as Bahār-e ‘Olyā; also known as Bahār-e Bālā) is a village in Sangar Rural District, in the Central District of Faruj County, North Khorasan Province, Iran. At the 2006 census, its population was 178, in 48 families.

References 

Populated places in Faruj County